Via Audio is the first studio album by the rock band Via Audio. It was released in 2004 by Kill Normal Records.

Track listing
 "Developing Active People" – 3:37
 "Mouth Shut" – 3:46	
 "If They Find Me" – 5:39
 "Our Lies + Your Smile" - 3:10	
 "Setup" – 7:18
 "The Perfect Fix" - 3:32

Personnel 
Jessica Martins: keyboards, guitars, vocals
Dan Molad: drums, programming, vocals
David Lizmi: bass guitar
Tom Deis: guitar, vocals

External links 
 Via Audio official website
 Kill Normal's official website

2004 debut EPs
Via Audio albums